Anuchinsky District is an administrative and municipal district (raion), one of the twenty-two in Primorsky Krai, Russia. It is located in the south of the krai and borders with Spassky District in the north, Yakovlevsky District and the territory of Arsenyev Town Under Krai Jurisdiction in the northeast, Chuguyevsky District in the east, Partizansky District in the southeast, the territory of Partizansk Town Under Krai Jurisdiction in the south and southeast, Shkotovsky District in the south and southwest, and with Mikhaylovsky and Chernigovsky Districts in the west. Its administrative center is the rural locality (a selo) of Anuchino. Population:  The population of Anuchino accounts for 30.5% of the district's total population.

Geography
The district is located in humid continental climate zone where the Sikhote-Alin mountains and plains of Khanka lowlands come together. As a result, the area has rich flora and fauna.

Economy
Agriculture is characterized by potato, vegetables, rice, cereals, and panax growth. Milk and meat cattle breeding is very developed in district.

Notable residents 

Svetlana Goryacheva (born 1947), politician, born in the village of Risovy
Petro Oliynyk (1957–2011), Ukrainian miner and politician, born in Novovarvarovka

References

Notes

Sources

Districts of Primorsky Krai
States and territories established in 1935